Mount Katmai is a large stratovolcano (composite volcano) on the Alaska Peninsula in southern Alaska, located within Katmai National Park and Preserve. The mountain is located in Kodiak Island Borough, very close to its border with Lake and Peninsula Borough.

Geology

Mount Katmai is one of five vents encircling the Novarupta volcano, source of the VEI 6 eruption and associated voluminous pyroclastic flows in 1912. The volcano has caused ten known fatalities due to gas exposure. Katmai consists chiefly of lava flows, pyroclastic rocks, and non-welded to agglutinated air fall. Much of the volcano is mantled by snow and ice and several valley glaciers radiate out from the flanks.

Volcanic activity
Little is known about the historical activity of Katmai volcano before the great 1912 eruption.

During June 6 to 9, 1912, the most spectacular Alaskan eruption in recorded history and the 20th century's largest measured volcanic eruption formed a large summit caldera at Katmai volcano. During over 60 hours, the volcano erupted an estimated  of ash flows and tephra representing  of magma volume. The eruption produced a cloud of suffocating gas and ash that blackened the sky for the inhabitants of the town of Kodiak, who, with ash falling on them were led to the U.S. Coast Guard Cutter Manning where they sheltered in the harbor and were cared for by the crew because Captain Perry determined "an attempt to leave here would be unwise" because the eruption made navigation dangerous. The withdrawal of magma beneath Katmai resulted in the collapse of the summit area, forming the caldera. Following the subsidence, a small dacitic lava dome known as Horseshoe Island was emplaced on the floor of the caldera; this is the only juvenile material erupted from Katmai caldera during the historical eruption. It was visible at the time of the expedition in 1916, but has since been submerged by the crater lake. Still, the eruption from Katmai had a VEI of 3, and possibly involved phreatic eruptions.

Following the eruption, thousands of fumaroles vented steam from the ash, creating the Valley of Ten Thousand Smokes.

In 1919, geologists noted a lake covering a large part of the caldera floor. By 1923 the lake was gone and numerous fumaroles, mud pots, and a large mud geyser had replaced it. Small glaciers have formed on a bench within the caldera beside the lake. Pumice still floats on Naknek Lake nearby.

See also
 List of volcanoes in the United States

References

Other sources
 
 Alaska Volcano Observatory: Katmai

Further reading
 Erskine, Wilson Fiske. (1965). Katmai. A narrative of the eruption of June 1912 and its effects on the town of Kodiak and its community, taken from letters, diaries and notes written at the time. London, New York and Toronto: Abelard-Schuman.
 Hildreth, W., J. Fierstein, and J.E. Robinson. (2003). Geologic map of the Katmai Volcanic Cluster, Katmai National Park, Alaska [Geologic Investigations Series Map I-2778]. Reston, VA: U.S. Department of the Interior, U.S. Geological Survey.

Stratovolcanoes of the United States
Active volcanoes
Volcanoes of Kodiak Island Borough, Alaska
Mountains of Kodiak Island Borough, Alaska
Mountains of Alaska
Volcanoes of Alaska
Calderas of Alaska
Volcanic crater lakes
Aleutian Range
Katmai National Park and Preserve
Holocene calderas